Otternes, a Norwegian linear - and cluster collective farmyard midway between Aurland and Flåm in Vestland county. The farmyard consists of 27 buildings.

History 
Evidence shows settlements from about 300 A.D. The oldest buildings, Guttormstova and Eilertstova were built about 1700. The land redistribution reform in the 1860s were not implemented in Otternes where the allocation of strip of fields lasted until 1987. Otternes consisted originally of four farms: Tomas farm, Guttorm farm, Odda farm and Anders farm. In the nineteenth century about 30 people lived there in the farmplace. The two remaining farms were run in the old fashion until 1970. Otternes has thus been hardly affected by the passage of time, and some of the buildings appear more or less as they did in the 18th century. The cultivated landscape remains essentially intact with hills, stairs, stone walls, wells, etc.

Otternes has been without residents since 1996. As a result of its historic flavor, the locale has therefore been a setting for several film productions.

Today Otternes serves as a rural museum and a center for the older crafts. It is also used for traditional activities as spinning, weaving, thin wafer crispbread (flat bread) baking, yarn dyeing, ale brewing and a variety of other exhibitions in the summer time.

See also 
 Strip farming in Norway

External links 
 Otternes bygdetun 
 Otternes  

Villages in Vestland
Farms in Vestland
Historic farms in Norway